Thomas Algernon Chapman (2 July 1842, Glasgow – 17 December 1921) was a Scottish entomologist.

Chapman was a physician and an entomologist who specialised in Lepidoptera.

He became a fellow of the Entomological Society of London in 1891, of the Zoological Society of London and of the Royal Society, in 1918.

Sources 
 Michael A. Salmon (2000). The Aurelian Legacy. British Butterflies and their Collectors. With contributions by Peter Marren and Basil Harley. Harley Books (Colchester) : 432 p.

Scottish entomologists
1921 deaths
Scottish lepidopterists
1842 births
Scientists from Glasgow
19th-century Scottish medical doctors
Fellows of the Royal Society